Two Way Monologue is the second album release by the Norwegian singer-songwriter Sondre Lerche, released in 2004.

Track listing
All songs written by Sondre Lerche.

Personnel
All songs written and composed by Sondre Lerche Vaular.
Produced by Jørgen Træen and HP Gundersen.
Arranged by the artist and the producers.
Logo and Cover design by Dave Kinsey, BLK/MRKT

References

2004 albums
Sondre Lerche albums